The chapters of Angel Sanctuary were written and illustrated by Kaori Yuki. Angel Sanctuary appeared as a serial in the manga magazine Hana to Yume. Hakusensha collected and published the chapters in twenty tankōbon volumes from February 1995 to 19 February 2001. Hakusensha later re-released Angel Sanctuary in ten bunkoban volumes, from 14 June 2002, to 13 June 2003.

Angel Sanctuary is licensed by Viz Media for an English-language release in North America. Volume one was published 2004 and the final volume was released on 12 June 2007. Angel Sanctuary is also licensed for regional language releases in German by Carlsen Comics, in Italian by Panini Comics, in French by Editions Tonkam, and in Russia by Comix-art and Eksmo.



Volume list

Japanese rerelease

References

Angel Sanctuary